Robert Mitwerandu (27 February 1970 – 7 May 2000) was a Polish footballer who played as a midfielder.

Born to a Zimbabwean father, he was the first black and Afro-Polish player in any Poland national football team and the Ekstraklasa. Born and raised in Chorzów, he spoke Silesian fluently. He unexpectedly died of a stroke on the night 7 May 2000, only a few hours after playing for Raków Częstochowa against Polar Wrocław.

Career statistics

Club

Notes

References 

1970 births
2000 deaths
Polish footballers
Zimbabwean footballers
Polish people of Zimbabwean descent
Association football midfielders
GKS Katowice players
Raków Częstochowa players
Ekstraklasa players